Maria Michela Marzano (born 20 August 1970) is an Italian researcher, philosopher and writer. Politically connected to the Italian left, she was elected a Member of the Italian Parliament for the Democratic Party in February 2013.

Biography 
Michela Marzano was born in Rome in 1970. She studied philosophy at the Scuola Normale Superiore di Pisa and specialized in analytical philosophy and Bioethics at Sapienza University of Roma.

In 1998, she defended her thesis at the Scuola Normale Superiore on the status of the human body, which led her to follow continuing discourse on the topic. Marzano traveled to France in 1999 and enrolled at the French National Center for Scientific Research in 2000. In 2010, Marzano became a professor of philosophy at Paris Descartes University.

Marzano's specialty is in ethics and political philosophy, and focuses primarily on the space that human beings occupy today, especially as Carnal beings. Her analysis looks at human fragility. Politically, Marzano criticizes European liberalism and the myth of self-confidence. Marzano has written editorial pieces in La Repubblica on debates between Italy and France.

In her book, Légère comme un papillon (Light Like a Butterfly), Marzano revealed the role that anorexia had played in her life.

Political career 
In the 2013 Italian general election, Marzano stood as a Democratic Party candidate in Milan and was elected a member of the Chamber of Deputies and was able to join the government coalition of Pier Luigi Bersani. She was appointed to the Justice Committee and on the Parliamentary Commission for Children and Adolescents. On 4 May 2015, she voted against the Italian electoral law of 2015, which was proposed by the government. In 2016, Marzano left the Democratic Party when the government proposal on civil unions did not provide the possibility for same-sex couples to adopt children. She joined the Mixed Group but continued to support the government coalition.

Publications 

 Penser le corps, PUF, 2002 
 La pornographie ou L'épuisement du désir, Buchet-Chastel, 2003 
 La fidélité ou L'amour à vif, Buchet-Chastel, 2005 
 Alice au pays du porno (avec Claude Rozier), Ramsay, 2005 
 Le corps : films X : y jouer ou y être, entretien avec Ovidie, Autrement, 2005 
 Malaise dans la sexualité, JC Lattès, 2006 
 Je consens, donc je suis... : éthique de l’autonomie, PUF, 2006 
 Philosophie du corps, PUF, 2007 
 Dictionnaire du corps, PUF, 2007 
 L'éthique appliquée, Paris, PUF, coll. « Que sais-je ? », 2010
 Extension du domaine de la manipulation : de l'entreprise à la vie privée, Grasset, 2008 
 Le fascisme : un encombrant retour ?, Paris, Larousse, coll. « Philosopher », 2009.
 Le contrat de défiance, Grasset, 2010. publié ensuite chez Pluriel en mai 2012 sous le titre Éloge de la confiance

References

External links 
 Page personnelle sur le site du CERSES
 Page personnelle sur le site du CERLIS

Academic staff of the Sapienza University of Rome
University of Pisa alumni
Scuola Normale Superiore di Pisa alumni
Democratic Party (Italy) politicians
Deputies of Legislature XVII of Italy
Italian writers in French
21st-century Italian writers
21st-century Italian women writers
Italian women philosophers
Italian philosophers
1970 births
Bioethicists
Living people
21st-century Italian women politicians
Women members of the Chamber of Deputies (Italy)